Parliamentary committees of the New Zealand House of Representatives are groups of MPs appointed by the House of Representatives and tasked with overseeing bills and government policy in detail. Committees for the 53rd Parliament are established by Standing Order 189.

Committee of the whole House
The procedure of legislation passing through Parliament requires the House to form itself into a 'Committee of the whole House' following a second reading, allowing for the bill to be debated part-by-part by all Members. This committee sees the Deputy Speaker or Assistant Speakers presiding over it.

Select committees
Since the 1960s select committees have taken an increasingly powerful role, dealing with more bills. From the 1970s they became more open to the public and the media, and from 1979 they handled nearly all legislation. The strengthening of the committee system was in response to concerns that legislation was being forced through, without receiving due examination and revision.

Each new Parliament appoints a number of committees – these remain largely unchanged between parliaments. Legislation is scrutinised by select committees following the first reading of a bill. The committees can call for submissions from the public, thereby meaning that there is a degree of public consultation before a parliamentary bill proceeds into law. There are two types of committees:

 Subject committees – established to oversee government actions and policy in a specified subject area, as well as examining bills in detail. Subject committees are empowered to hold the Government to account, with ministers presenting evidence and answering questions as necessary. The committees may recommend amendments to a bill when they report back to the House and such recommendations are voted on at the second reading. There are currently twelve such committees.
 Specialist committees – established to oversee the procedures of the House itself. There are currently six such committees.

The present system, with permanent committees for designated subject matters, was implemented in 1985, in order to promote accountability and a greater separation of Parliament from government.

Composition
Each committee consists of between six and twelve MPs. Political parties are generally represented approximately in similar proportions as they are represented in the House as a whole. Membership of committees is determined by the Business Specialist Committee at the beginning of each parliament. Attempts are made to allocate MPs into committees for subject areas those MPs have experience in. Each committee elects its own chairperson. Each select committee has a chairperson and a deputy chairperson. MPs may be, and almost always are, members of more than one select committee. Cabinet ministers do not sit on committees generally, though there are some exceptions (usually for Specialist committees). Some ministers outside Cabinet are required to sit on subject committees to ensure that the governing parties can fill all their allocated places.

Membership of the Business Committee itself is determined by the Speaker (who chairs) and political party leaders.

List of committees in the 53rd Parliament

Historical composition of committees
The following table lists the select and specialist committees of the previous, and their respective chairs and membership breakdown.

52nd Parliament
Bolded and italicized denotes a temporary committee established uniquely during the 52nd Parliament.

See also
Politics of New Zealand
New Zealand Parliament
Constitution of New Zealand

References

External links
 List of select committees – New Zealand Parliament

New Zealand, House of Representatives
Parliament of New Zealand
Parliamentary committees
Constitution of New Zealand
Westminster system
Politics of New Zealand